Coast 2 Coast is the sixth album released by American rapper B-Legit released off of Oarfin Records released on August 14, 2007.

Track listing

"Intro" - :22
"Get That Money" - 3:52
"How We Ball" - 4:07
"Big Paper Chase" - 3:55
"My Gunz" - 3:12
"Skit" - :26
"Enemies" - :53
"Street" - 2:39
"Back When" - 3:25
"Skit" - 4:31
"Trap Stars" - 5:25
"Skit" - :29
"Fu'k Ya'll" - 3:31
"Lucky" 4:01
"I Get Gorilla Wit IT" 4:01

References

External links
 
 

B-Legit albums
2007 albums
West Coast hip hop albums